Pearsall is a surname. Notable people with that name include:

 Alan Pearsall (1915–1944),  Australian sportsman
 Aleck Pearsall, 19th-century American baseball player
 A. W. H. Pearsall (1925–2006), English historian
 Benjamin Pearsall (1878– 1951), Australian politician
 Deborah M. Pearsall (born 1950), American archaeologist 
 Derek Pearsall, medievalist and Chaucer scholar
 Duane D. Pearsall (1922–2010), American entrepreneur
 Geoff Pearsall (born 1946), Australian politician
 Jack Pearsall (1915–1982), Canadian politician
 Kenneth H. Pearsall (1918–1999), American clergyman, president of Northwest Nazarene College
 Phyllis Pearsall (1906–1996), British painter and writer
 Richard Pearsall (1698–1762), English Congregationalist minister
 Robert Pearsall (architect) (1852–1929), English architect
 Robert Lucas de Pearsall (1795–1856), English composer
 Ronald Pearsall (1927–2005), English author
 Stacy Pearsall (born 1980), American photographer and U.S. Air Force veteran
 Thomas Pearsall (Australian politician) (1920–2003), Australian politician
 Thomas Pearsall (cricketer) (born 1943), English cricketer
 Thomas J. Pearsall (1903–1981), American politician and philanthropist
 Will Pearsall (born 1995), Australian rugby league footballer
 William Harold Pearsall (1891–1964), Botanist

See also
 Alys Pearsall Smith, first wife of Bertrand Russell
 Logan Pearsall Smith, American essayist
 Robert Pearsall Smith, lay leader in the Holiness Movement in Great Britain
 Pearson (surname)